Homo unius libri ('(a) man of one book') is a Latin phrase attributed to Thomas Aquinas by bishop Jeremy Taylor (1613–1667), who claimed that Aquinas is reputed to have employed the phrase "hominem unius libri timeo" ('I fear the man of a single book').

The poet Robert Southey recalled the tradition in which the quotation became embedded: 

The phrase was in origin a dismissal of eclecticism, i.e. the "fear" is of the formidable intellectual opponent who has dedicated himself to and become a master in a single chosen discipline. In this first sense, the phrase was used by Methodist founder John Wesley, referring to himself, with "one book" taken to mean the Bible. However, the phrase today most often refers to the interpretation of expressing "fear" of the opinions of the illiterate man who has "only read a single book".

John Wesley invoked the phrase in this sense and declared himself to be a "homo unius libri", the "one book" being the Bible.

Notes

Eugene H. Ehrlich, Amo Amas Amat and More: How to use Latin to Your Own Advantage and the Astonishment of Others, p. 279. "An observation attributed to Aquinas"

External links

Latin literary phrases